Macrosia is a genus of moths in the subfamily Arctiinae. The genus was erected by George Hampson in 1900.

Species
 Macrosia chalybeata Hampson, 1901
 Macrosia fumeola Walker, 1854

Former species
 Macrosia wiltshirei Tams, 1939

References

External links

Lithosiini
Moth genera